Torridge and West Devon is a constituency represented in the House of Commons of the UK Parliament since 2005 by Geoffrey Cox, a Conservative.

Boundaries	

1983–1997: The District of Torridge, and the Borough of West Devon.

1997–2010: The District of Torridge, and the Borough of West Devon except the ward of Buckland Monachorum.

2010–present: The District of Torridge, and the Borough of West Devon wards of Bere Ferrers, Bridestowe, Buckland Monachorum, Burrator, Lydford, Mary Tavy, Milton Ford, Tamarside, Tavistock North, Tavistock South, Tavistock South West, Thrushel, and Walkham.

Before the 2010 general election, the constituency comprised Torridge District and almost all of West Devon District. However, in the redistribution of that year, when the number of seats in the county rose from 11 to 12, the town of Okehampton and scattered small settlements surrounding it transferred to the new Central Devon seat.

The constituency area contains the former borough constituencies of Bere Alston (abolished 1832, settlement part of Bere Ferrers) and Tavistock (abolished 1885).

History
The constituency was created in 1983, largely from the abolished West Devon seat, but with additions then and later from North Devon which was formed in 1950.

Political history
The seat unusually saw its second member, (Emma Nicholson), who attained the second absolute majority in its history, a Conservative, defect or "cross the floor" in 1995 to the Liberal Democrats. After the 1997 election she was appointed to the House of Lords.

At 1997 election the seat was won by the Liberal Democrat candidate John Burnett. He also was elevated to the peerage, and after standing down, the seat was gained by Geoffrey Cox of the Conservative Party who attained a majority of 3,236 votes in 2005. In 2010 he won with a majority of 2,957, boundary changes making the reduced majority notionally a 0.2% swing from the Liberal Democrats - compared with a 2.3% swing between the two parties nationally.

In 2015 the Liberal Democrat vote collapsed and they came third behind UKIP and the Conservatives. Cox was elected with an absolute majority.

In 2017 the absence of UKIP saw Labour come second behind the Conservatives. Cox further increased his absolute majority, which became the largest in Devon and Cornwall.

In 2019, Cox was re-elected with 60.1% of the vote and a majority of 24,992 (41.8%), the highest vote share ever recorded in the seat, and once again the largest majority in Devon and Cornwall.

Constituency profile
The economy of the area is dominated by sectors such as agriculture, food processing, defence, hospitality, construction, maintenance and engineering and from Bideford and Northam a small amount of fishing; it also includes tourism, such as the island of Lundy, and sandy resort of Westward Ho!, to the small, centrally pedestrianised, cobbled, museum-dotted village of Clovelly. Great Torrington and Buckland Monachorum are among the archetypal rural villages, in an area with tranquil retreats, relatively close to the edge of Dartmoor.

Workless claimants, registered jobseekers,  were in November 2012 lower than the national average of 3.8%, at 2.5% of the population based on a statistical compilation by The Guardian.

Members of Parliament

Elections

Elections in the 2010s

Elections in the 2000s

Elections in the 1990s

Elections in the 1980s

See also
List of parliamentary constituencies in Devon

Notes

References

Parliamentary constituencies in Devon
Constituencies of the Parliament of the United Kingdom established in 1983